Alexander Dougall Blackader (June 19, 1847 – March 14, 1932) was a Canadian-American pediatrician.

Biography
Alexander D. Blackader was born in Montreal on June 19, 1847. He earned first-class honors at McGill University and studied at St Thomas' Hospital in London.

He was the president of the American Pediatric Society for 1892–93. He gave the 1929 Bradshaw Lecture.

He died in Montreal on March 14, 1932.

References 

Presidents of the American Pediatric Society
American pediatricians
Canadian pediatricians
1847 births
1932 deaths